Charles Abel Corwin (January 6, 1857 – January 28, 1938) was an American painter and lithographer.

He was a staff artist at the Field Museum of Natural History from 1903 to 1938.

In the 1910 American Art Annual, he was listed as being based in Haworth, New Jersey.

References

External links

 

1857 births
1938 deaths
19th-century American male artists
19th-century American painters
19th-century lithographers
20th-century American male artists
20th-century American painters
20th-century lithographers
American lithographers
American male painters
Artists from Chicago
Painters from Illinois
Painters from New Jersey
Painters from New York (state)
People associated with the Field Museum of Natural History
People from Haworth, New Jersey
People from Newburgh, New York
Place of death missing